The Lohia family is a business family of Indian origin, doing business in the textile and petrochemicals industries under the umbrella corporate name Indorama. They own Indonesia/Singapore-based Indorama Corporation and Thailand-based Indorama Ventures, and were ranked by Forbes as the 29th richest family in Asia in 2017.

The family progenitor is Mohan Lal Lohia, who migrated to Indonesia in 1973, where he established Indorama Synthetics with his son Sri Prakash in 1975. Sri Prakash's younger brother Aloke moved to Thailand and established Indorama Ventures in 1994. Indorama Corporation was established in Singapore in 2009 as a holding company for Sri Prakash's side of the business, and is managed by his son Amit. Mohan Lal's oldest son, Om Prakash, runs Indo Rama Synthetics in India, which is owned independently from the two international corporate groups. The family also has ties to Lakshmi Mittal, whose sister Seema is married to Sri Prakash.

References

 
Business families of India